Skaraborg County was a county of Sweden from 1634 until 1997. It was disestablished at the end of 1997 when it was merged with the counties of Gothenburg and Bohus and Älvsborg to form Västra Götaland County.

The county was named after a fortress outside the city of Skara. The seat of residence for the county governor was Mariestad from 1660 onwards and the largest city (during the 20th century) was first Lidköping and later Skövde. The county consisted of the northeastern part of the province of Västergötland.

Even though Skaraborg County itself no longer exists, various organizations are still named after it, and cover that approximate area. These include several newspapers, one public radio channel and various non-profit organizations. Also, the regional hospital complex in Skövde is named  as is the Skaraborg Wing (F 7) in Såtenäs and the Skaraborg Regiment (P 4) in Skövde.

Two of the municipalities, Habo and Mullsjö, adjacent to the city of Jönköping, were transferred to the Jönköping County at the time of dissolution.

See also
 List of governors of Skaraborg County
 List of governors of Västra Götaland County
 County administrative boards of Sweden

References

Former counties of Sweden
County
1634 establishments in Sweden
1997 disestablishments in Sweden